Pápa is a district in north-western part of Veszprém County. Pápa is also the name of the town where the district seat is found. The district is located in the Central Transdanubia Statistical Region.

Geography 
Pápa District borders with Csorna District, Tét District and Győr District (Győr-Moson-Sopron County) to the north, Pannonhalma District (Győr-Moson-Sopron County) and Zirc District to the east, Veszprém District, Ajka District and Devecser District to the south, Celldömölk District (Vas County) to the west. The number of the inhabited places in Pápa District is 49.

Municipalities 
The district has 1 town and 48 villages
(as of 1 January 2013).

The bolded municipality is city.

See also
List of cities and towns in Hungary

References

External links
 Postal codes of the Pápa District

Districts in Veszprém County